This is a list of properties and districts in Massachusetts listed on the National Register of Historic Places.  There are over 4,300 listings in the state, representing about 5% of all NRHP listings nationwide and the second-most of any U.S. state, behind only New York.  Listings appear in all 14 Massachusetts counties.

Notes

See also
 List of bridges on the National Register of Historic Places in Massachusetts
 List of National Historic Landmarks in Massachusetts

References

External links

 Massachusetts Cultural Resources Information System (MACRIS), the state's database of cultural inventory, including NRHP and state historic sites

History of Massachusetts
 
 
Massachusetts